In telecommunications, a facility is defined by Federal Standard 1037C as:
 A fixed, mobile, or transportable structure, including (a) all installed electrical and electronic wiring, cabling, and equipment and (b) all supporting structures, such as utility, ground network, and electrical supporting structures.
 A network-provided service to users or the network operating administration.
 A transmission pathway and associated equipment.
 In a protocol applicable to a data unit, such as a block or frame, an additional item of information or a constraint encoded within the protocol to provide the required control.
 A real property entity consisting of one or more of the following: a building, a structure, a utility system, pavement, and underlying land.

Global Telecom Facility
Telecommunications facility, is where a service can be offered. A location where a Incumbent Local Exchange Carriers (ILECs) have their Hardware to process Telecom services. A phone call made to Jamaica can not be processed by a Telecom Facility in Canada or USA. If a phone number series belongs to say operator or carriers in Jamaica then only that operator knows if that phone number is valid and further if that phone number is on net to place a valid phone call. So all carriers in the world get the signal from the Telecom Facilities of the Digicel in Jamaica.

In Canada
Telecommunications facility, is same as Airport Facility. A location where a Incumbent Local Exchange Carriers (ILECs) have their Hardware to process Telecom services.
Under Canadian federal and Québécois provincial law, a telecommunications facility, for the purposes of determining whether GST applies, is defined by §123(1) of the GST Act to be "any facility, apparatus, or other thing (including any wire, cable, radio, optical, or other electromagnetic system, or any similar technical system or any part thereof) that is used or is capable of being used for telecommunications".  This is a very broad definition that includes a wide range of things from satellites and earth stations, to telephones and fax machines.

References

Telecommunications buildings